Leptorhabdium is a genus of beetle in the family Cerambycidae. It contains the following species:

 Leptorhabdium caucasicum (Kraatz, 1879)
 Leptorhabdium illyricum  (Kraatz, 1870)
 Leptorhabdium nitidum  Holzschuh, 1974
 Leptorhabdium pictum  (Haldeman, 1847)

References

Lepturinae